Al-Tall (also spelled al-Tell) is a city in southern Syria, administratively part of the Rif Dimashq Governorate and capital of the al-Tall District. Situated in the middle of the Anti-Lebanon Mountains, having an elevation of roughly 1,000 meters above sea level. Nearby localities include Maaraba to the southwest, Damascus to the south, Dahiyat al-Assad and Douma to the southeast, Maarat Saidnaya to the northeast, Manin to the north, Ashrafiyat al-Wadi and Basimah to the northwest and al-Hamah and Qudsaya to the west. According to the Syria Central Bureau of Statistics (CBS), al-Tall had a population of 44,597 in the 2004 census. Its inhabitants are predominantly Sunni Muslims.

In the early 1960s al-Tall was reported to be a large village of 3,500 inhabitants. It had a large mosque surrounded by several column fragments, hewn stones and burial grottoes.

Notable People
 Muhammad Mustafa Mero, former Prime Minister of Syria

References

Bibliography

Cities in Syria
Populated places in Al-Tall District